Purna Chandra Hota (born in Odisha 9 September 1938, Died on 27 December 2020), was a former Indian bureaucrat, former Chairman, Union Public Service Commission (2002–2003). Prior to this, he was Member, Union Public service Commission Secretary, (1996–2002), Secretary, Ministry of Personnel, Public Grievances and Pension (Department of Personnel & Training) Ministry of Parliamentary Affairs (1995–96). He is married to Bijoylaxmi Hota, a Yoga expert and author of several books on Yogic therapy. He has three children, Reema Hota Singh, an Indian revenue Service Officer, Prasenjeet Hota, and Reela Hota, an odissi dancer. In 2019, Hota wrote a book on law titled ' Nuggets of Wisdom- Some path breaking judgements of the Supreme Court, published by Atlantic.

Early life and education
Born and brought up in Odisha as the eldest son of Banchanidi Hota, an Excise Official, P C Hota was educated in Ravenshaw College, Cuttack and University of Allahabad. A meritorious student, he  secured first division in Matriculation Examination, Onslow Institute, Chatrapur, Ganjam, Odisha (1953), First Class in the Intermediate Examination, Ravenshaw College(1957), First Class in B.A Honors, Ravenshaw College (1959), First Class MA in Political Science, University of Allahabad (1962).

Hota served as lecturer in the Post-Graduate Department of Political Science of the Utkal University. He competed in the I.A.S Examination held by the UPSC and was among the first ten candidates in order of merit. Hota was allotted Odisha Cadre of the I. A. S (1962) From 1966-84 Hota served as Commissioner & Secretary to Govt. of Odisha in different departments viz. Urban Development & Public Health Engineering, Health & Family Welfare, Harijan & Tribal Welfare, Irrigation & Power. From 1984-89, Hota was the Additional Secretary, Union Public Service Commission & Member Secretary of  Dr Satish Chandra Committee to review the scheme of Civil Services Examination (1988–89). As the Additional Secretary, Ministry of Labor, Government of India, (1990) he was appointed the Chairman of the Tripartite Committee appointed by Government of India, for framing a pension scheme for workers, which has been implemented since 1995

In February 2004, Hota was appointed by Government of India's Chairman of the Committee on Civil Services Reforms. He submitted the report of the Committee to the Government of India within six months. In January 2006, Hota was nominated by the Government of India to the court of the Banaras Hindu University. In May 2010, he was appointment by the Government of India as Chairman of a Committee of Experts, to suggest measures for expeditious disposal of disciplinary & vigilance enquiries.  In July 2010, he submitted the report of the Committee to the Government of India. In August 2012, he was conferred the degree of D. Lit (Honoris Causa) by Ravenshaw University in recognition of ‘Outstanding Contribution to Public Service’. In July 2013, he was appointed by the Government of Karnataka to recommend measures for reform of the practices and procedures of the Karnataka Public Service Commission. In August 2013, he submitted the report to the Government of Karnataka.

Hota studied law in the South Campus Law College of the University of Delhi while serving in the I.A.S. He was appointed as the Pro Vice-Chairman of Delhi Public Society (2014 till present).

International Delegations
 1982: Member of a Delegation to the World Bank, Washington DC for negotiating a loan for a major river valley project in Odisha   
 1991: Led the Indian delegation to the International Labor Conference at Geneva   
 1991: Member of the Indian delegation to the Asian Productivity Council at Bangkok  
 1992: Led the Indian Delegation to the International Social Security Association at Acapulco, Mexico  
 1995: Member of the Indian delegation to the Eastern Regional Organization of Public administration (EROPA) at Tokyo 
 1995: Member of the Indian delegation to the International Anti-Corruption Conference at Beijing  
 2001: Led a delegation of Union Public Service Commission for Study of Modalities of Recruitment to the Public Service in   Singapore and Australia

References

External links
 http://timesofindia.indiatimes.com/india/P-C-Hota-takes-over-as-UPSC-chief/articleshow/14080805.cms
 http://www.thehindu.com/todays-paper/tp-national/tp-karnataka/fresh-exam-based-on-panel-ecommendations/article6297550.ece
 http://upscblog.com/2012/02/05/committee-on-civil-service-reforms
 http://www.newindianexpress.com/states/karnataka/Karnataka-public-service-commission-to-be-modelled-on-lines-of-UPSC/2013/08/24/article1749373.ece
 https://www.scribd.com/doc/145879629/CivilServicesReforms-P-C-Hota-Committee-Recommendations#scribd
 http://iasscore.in/special-details.php?id=5
 http://www.deccanherald.com/content/353138/upsc-model-followed-bring-reforms.html
 http://ccis.nic.in/writeReadData/circularPortal/D2/D02ser/Para-36A-14102013.pdf

1938 births
Living people
Indian Administrative Service officers
People from Odisha
Chairmen of Union Public Service Commission